Hadji-Sejdeli is an abandoned village in the municipality of Štip, North Macedonia.

Demographics

The settlement last had inhabitants in the 1961 census, where it was recorded as being populated by 4 Albanians and 4 "others".

According to the 2002 census, the village had 0 inhabitants. Ethnic groups in the village include:

References

Villages in Štip Municipality
Albanian communities in North Macedonia